Abuite is a colorless calcium aluminium phosphate mineral with chemical formula CaAl(PO)F. It is chemically similar to galliskiite with the exception that it is hydrated.

References 

Calcium minerals
Aluminium minerals
Phosphate minerals